Treasure of the Golden Condor is a 1953 American Technicolor adventure film directed by Delmer Daves, starring Cornel Wilde and Constance Smith, and released by Twentieth Century Fox. The film is a remake of the 1942 film Son of Fury: The Story of Benjamin Blake, which starred Tyrone Power. Both films were based on Benjamin Blake (1941), a novel by Edison Marshall.

Plot
Jean Paul (Cornel Wilde) is a Frenchman, who is cheated of his birthright by his deceitful uncle, Marquis de St Malo (George Macready).

Cast
 Cornel Wilde as Jean Paul
 Constance Smith as Clara MacDougal
 Finlay Currie as MacDougal
 Walter Hampden as Pierre Champlain
 Anne Bancroft as Marie, Comtesse de St. Malo
 George Macready as Marquis de St. Malo
 Fay Wray as Annette, Marquise de St. Malo
 Leo G. Carroll as Raoul Dondel
 Konstantin Shayne as Father Benoit
 Robert Blake as Stable boy (uncredited)
 May Wynn as Maid (uncredited)
 Harry Cording as Breton (uncredited)

References

External links
 
 
 
 

1953 adventure films
1953 films
20th Century Fox films
American adventure films
Remakes of American films
1950s English-language films
Films based on American novels
Films directed by Delmer Daves
Films scored by Sol Kaplan
Films set in France
Films set in Guatemala
Films set in the 18th century
Films shot in Guatemala
1950s American films